Aundh State was a Maratha princely state in the British Raj, in the Deccan States Agency division of the Bombay Presidency.

The Principality of Aundh covered an area of 1298 square kilometers with the population of 88,762 in 1941.

The capital of the state was Aundh.

History
Aundh was a Jagir granted by Chhatrapati Sambhaji to Parshuram Trimbak Pant Pratinidhi, who was a general, administrator and later Pratinidhi of the Maratha Empire during the reign of Chhatrapati Sambhaji and Chhatrapati Rajaram.  He played a crucial role in re-capturing Panhala Fort, Ajinkyatara (at Satara), Bhupalgad forts from Mughals during period of 1700–1705.

After the fall of Peshwa rule, the British East India company entered separate treaties in 1820 with all the Jagirdars who were nominally subordinate to the Raja of Satara. Aundh became a princely state when Satara state was abolished by the British under the Doctrine of lapse.
The last ruler of the Aundh was Raja Shrimant Bhawanrao Shriniwasrao Pant Pratinidhi ("Bala Sahib"). The state joined the Union of India on 8 March 1948.

Rulers
Aundh's Hindu rulers used the title of "Pant Pratinidhi".

See also
 Pant Pratinidhi family
 Aundh Experiment
 Maratha Empire
 List of Maratha dynasties and states
 List of Indian princely states

References

Bibliography
 
 
 
 

Princely states of Maharashtra
States and territories established in 1699
Satara district
1699 establishments in Asia